Bezmer Air Base  is an air base for the Bulgarian Air Force.  The base is situated in the eastern part of the Upper Thracian Lowland, in Yambol Oblast (Region), 10 km west of the city of Yambol and 30 km southeast of the city of Sliven, between the villages of Bezmer and Bolyarsko, and near the Sofia-Burgas railway.  The base takes its name from the nearby village, which is named after Khan Bezmer of Bulgaria (7th Century AD).

History

World War I
The strategic location and particularly favorable weather conditions of the area was appreciated already during World War I, when the Imperial German Air Service built in Yambol a base for zeppelins used for reconnaissance and bombing missions to Romania, Russia, Sudan and Malta.

Post World War II
In 1955 the Bezmer Air Base hosted the 22 Fighter Air Regiment, later transformed into 22 Fighter-Bomber Air Regiment, and eventually into 22 Attack Air Base of the Bulgarian Air Force, serving as a base for Su-25 ground attack aircraft, as well as Su-22М-4 and Su-22UM-3K reconnaissance planes.

Modern times
The Bezmer Air Base is situated in the eastern part of the Upper Thracian Lowland, in Yambol Oblast (Region), 20 km west of the city of Yambol and 30 km southeast of the city of Sliven, between the villages of Bezmer and Bolyarsko, and near the Sofia-Burgas railway. The base takes its name from the nearby village, which is named after Khan Bezmer of Bulgaria (7th Century AD).

The strategic location and particularly favorable weather conditions of the area was appreciated already during World War I, when the Imperial German Air Service built in Yambol a base for zeppelins used for reconnaissance and bombing missions to Romania, Russia, Sudan and Malta.

In 1955 the Bezmer Air Base hosted the 22 Fighter Air Regiment, later transformed into 22 Fighter-Bomber Air Regiment, and eventually into 22 Attack Air Base of the Bulgarian Air Force, serving as a base for Su-25 Frogfoot ground attack aircraft, as well as Su-22М-4 and Su-22UM-3K reconnaissance planes. Aircraft and personnel from Bezmer have recently been participating in a number of joint military exercises including the PfP ‘Cooperative Key’ in Turkey, Bulgaria, Romania and France, ‘Immediate Response 2005’ and the Bulgarian-American-Romanian ‘Immediate Response 2006’.

Current use
Aircraft and personnel from Bezmer have recently been participating in a number of joint military exercises including the PfP "Cooperative Key" in Turkey, Bulgaria, Romania and France, ‘Immediate Response 2005’ and the Bulgarian-American-Romanian "Immediate Response 2006".

The base has a modern communication, information and navigation system.  A second phase of modernization and infrastructure development is underway, including a runway extension, which would expand the range of aircraft the base can support.

The Bezmer Air Base is among the joint US-Bulgarian military bases established according to the 2006 Defense Cooperation Agreement between the United States and Bulgaria.  Some experts rank Bezmer among the six most important American military bases outside mainland USA.

United States Secretary of Defense Lloyd Austin visited the base on March 18, 2022.

Images

See also
Dobrich Air Base
Graf Ignatievo Air Base
Gabrovnitsa Air Base
Cheshnegirovo Air Base
Dobroslavtsi Air Base
Uzundzhovo Air Base
Ravnets Air Base
Vrazhdebna Air Base
List of Bulgarian Air Force bases
List of Bulgarian military bases
28th Air Detachment
Bulgaria
Military of Bulgaria
Bulgarian cosmonaut program
List of joint US-Bulgarian military bases
Bulgarian-American Joint Military Facilities

References

Citations

Bibliography

 L. Ivanov and P. Pantev eds., The Joint Bulgarian-American Military Facilities: Public opinion and strategic, political, economic, and environmental aspects, NI Plus Publishing House, Sofia, 2006 (in Bulgarian)
 L. Ivanov ed., Bulgaria: Bezmer and adjacent regions — Guide for American military, Multiprint Ltd., Sofia, 2007, 

Airports in Bulgaria
Military installations of Bulgaria

de:Amerikanische Militärbasen in Bulgarien